Nothing Bad Can Happen is a 2013 German drama film directed by Katrin Gebbe. It was screened in the Un Certain Regard section at the 2013 Cannes Film Festival, following the acquisition of the United States rights by Drafthouse Films.

Cast
  as Tore
  as Benno
  as Astrid
  as Sanny
 Til-Niklas Theinert as Dennis
 Daniel Michel as Eule
  as Cora
 Laura Lo Zito as Lilli
  as Jasper
  as Dieter
 Christian Bergmann as Klaus
 Torben Lohmann as Pastor

Background
The film is based on true events that were discovered by Gebbe in an Internet article. The director explained in a July 2013 interview: "The characters deeply touched me ... It was so far away from life. And I felt there would be so many themes to discover – about relationships, guilt, desire, belief, idealism, love, bravery… I was searching for more than an easy explanation."

From the outset, Gebbe collaborated with producer Verena Gräfe-Höft and the pair attained funding from German film fund Hamburg Schleswig-Holstein (FFHSH). Following the approval of financing, Gebbe wrote the screenplay for the film that she would also direct. Gebbe explained the next step in the July 2013 interview:

In Germany you really have to find a TV channel to raise most of the money and get some more from the film funds. So that next step was tough. We wanted to follow our vision, which of course would also mean that the story would be told in an arthouse way. We didn't want to compromise what we wanted to show and what we didn't want to tell.

Following the receipt of further funding from FFHSH, as well as the Nordmedia company, production commenced, and the crew and cast received low salaries due to the low budget of the film. The film is Gebbe's debut feature film and is the first female-directed film to enter the Drafthouse catalog.

Following the film's screening at Cannes in May 2013, the film was also included in the program of the Melbourne International Film Festival (MIFF), held during July and August 2013. Gebbe was in attendance at both of the MIFF screenings and participated in Q&A sessions with festival goers.

Reception
Nothing Bad Can Happen was the only German feature film at the 2013 Cannes Film Festival and Gebbe revealed the response that she observed following the Cannes screening: "We expected it to be controversial, and that was what happened. We had boos and cheers, escapees and long standing ovations. It was intense! I think we stirred up a hornets' nest. And that is what artists should do." As of 28 July 2013, critical reviews of Gebbe's debut are mixed. Variety'''s Scott Foundas acknowledges the director's talent, the memorable acting efforts of newcomers Julius Feldmeier and Swantje Kohlhof, and the cinematography of Moritz Schultheiss, but also labels Gebbe's work on the film as "muddled" and "misdirected." Ion Cinema's Nicolas Bell concludes his review by stating "there’s something that doesn’t quite sit well by the closing credits" and criticizes a "weak" script. In a break from its usual format, horror film website Fangoria'' published a review of the film by Samuel Zimmerman who commended Gebbe's film as a "riveting example of transcendent horror."

Accolades 
The film won the Emeric Pressburger Prize at the 2013 Miskolc International Film Festival.

Release
The film is an official selection for the 2014 Stanley Film Festival.

References

External links
  - Drafthouse Films
 

2013 films
2013 drama films
Films about religion
German drama films
2010s German-language films
2010s German films